Franciszek Szymura (7 December 1912, Dortmund – 18 May 1985, Warsaw) was a Polish boxer who competed four times in the European Amateur Boxing Championships (1937, 1939, 1947, and 1949) and in the 1948 Summer Olympics.

He won twice the silver medal in the 1937 European Amateur Boxing Championships in Milan and the 1939 European Amateur Boxing Championships in Dublin, lost twice by Luigi Musina, the upcoming professional European champion (1942–1947). At the 1948 Summer Olympics in London, he was eliminated in the quarterfinals of the Light heavyweight class after losing his fight to the upcoming bronze medalist Mauro Cia.

He was also a basketball player and represented Poland at the EuroBasket 1946.

References

External links
Polski Komitet Olimpijski – Szymura Franciszek

1912 births
1985 deaths
Olympic boxers of Poland
Boxers at the 1948 Summer Olympics
Sportspeople from Dortmund
Polish male boxers
Light-heavyweight boxers